Several ships have been named Himalaya, after the mountain range in Asia:

 , a large troopship launched in 1853 as the P&O Steam Navigation Company's passenger liner Himalaya
 , a British India Steam Navigation Company passenger-cargo liner
 , a P&O Steam Navigation Company passenger liner, sold to the Admiralty in 1916 as a seaplane carrier and repurchased in 1919.
 , a P&O Steam Navigation Company passenger liner

References

Ship names